A list of films produced by the Marathi language film industry based in Maharashtra in the year 1957.

1957 Releases
A list of Marathi films released in 1957.

References

Lists of 1957 films by country or language
 Marathi
1957